The Book Rights Registry is an entity to be founded as part of a settlement of the lawsuit between the Authors Guild and Google over the Google Books scanning project. The Registry will be initially funded by $34.5 million from Google but it will be an independent, not-for-profit organization that collects and disburses revenue from third party users of content (e.g. Google Book Search) to authors, publishers and other rightsholders. According to the Settlement Agreement, the Registry will own and maintain a rights information database for all books (and parts of books) covered by the Agreement and their authors and publishers. It will also resolve disputes between rightsholders.

Michael Healy, the current head (as of September 2009) of the Book Industry Study Group, is slated to become the new head of the Registry.

Authors Guild president Roy Blount, Jr. described it as "the writers' equivalent of ASCAP."

Criticism
The Open Book Alliance – whose members include American Society of Journalists and Authors, Internet Archive, Amazon, Yahoo, National Writers Union and New York Library Association among others – maintain the deal would create a de facto exclusive license for Google because the deal grants no rights to the BRR to license books to competitors – copyright owners will have to license Google's competitors voluntarily, while Google gets an involuntary, virtual compulsory license through class action process. As a result, only Google receives a license to "orphan books", whose owners won't show up to license competitors and which comprise an estimated 70% of books. In short, the settlement all but guarantees that Google would have permanent competitive advantages around comprehensiveness and cost. This is one reason why the Department of Justice is investigating the proposed deal and numerous non-profit organizations, academics and other stakeholders have condemned it.

Pam Samuelson, UC Berkeley Professor of Law says "Libraries everywhere are terrified that Google will engage in price-gouging when setting prices for institutional subscriptions to "the works"

Legacy 
The settlement was rejected by a judge in 2011, and the lawsuit itself was dismissed in 2013. However, google was allowed to continue scanning millions of books from various libraries, even though the full texts of those books remain inaccessible. This scanning project boosted the growth of the a partnership of libraries known as the HathiTrust Digital Library. About 95% of HathiTrust's unique holdings were scanned by google. Although most of the full texts are not accessible directly, they can be queried in aggregate with tools such as google's Ngram Viewer.

See also 
 Google Book Search Settlement Agreement
 Books in the United States

References

External links
 
 
 
 
 

2008 establishments in the United States
Google Books
United States copyright law
Copyright agencies
Authors Guild